Paul Connaughton Snr (born 6 June 1944) is a former Irish Fine Gael politician who served as Minister of State for Land Structure and Development from 1982 to 1987. He served as a Teachta Dála (TD) for the Galway East constituency from 1981 to 2011. He also served as a Senator for the Agricultural Panel from 1977 to 1981.

Connaughton was born in Mountbellew, County Galway. He was educated at St. Jarlath's Vocational School, Mountbellew, and Mountbellew Agricultural College where he did an IMI Management Course. Connaughton first became involved in politics in 1979, when he became a member of Galway County Council. He served on that authority on two occasions between 1979 and 1985, and again from 1991 to 2003.

He was an unsuccessful candidate at the 1975 Galway North-East by-election and the 1977 general election. He was elected to Seanad Éireann as a Senator for the Agricultural Panel in 1977. Connaughton was first elected to Dáil Éireann at the 1981 general election as a Fine Gael TD for Galway East, and was returned at every subsequent election until his retirement in 2011. Between 1982 and 1987, Fine Gael were in government and Connaughton served as Minister of State at the Department of Agriculture with special responsibility for Land Structure and Development. Following the parties return to opposition, he was Fine Gael Spokesperson on Energy and Western Development and Chairman of the Political Affairs Committee between 1993 and 1997.

Between 1997 and 2000, he was Spokesman on Agriculture and Food. He was Fine Gael front bench Spokesperson on Marine, Natural Resources and Energy from June 2000 to February 2001. In Enda Kenny's Front Bench reshuffle in 2004 Connaughton became Spokesperson on Regional Development and Regional Affairs. He has also served as spokesman on a range of portfolios including Agriculture; Social Welfare; Defence and Tourism; and Older People during his political career.

His daughter Sinead Connaughton was a member of Galway County Council representing the Tuam local electoral area from 2003–2009. His son Paul Connaughton Jnr was elected to Galway County Council at the 2009 local elections representing the Ballinasloe local electoral area.

He was party Deputy spokesperson on Foreign Affairs with special responsibility for the Irish diaspora from 2010 to 2011.

He retired from politics at the 2011 general election. His son Paul Connaughton Jnr served as a Fine Gael TD for Galway East from 2011 to 2016.

References

1944 births
Living people
Fine Gael TDs
Members of the 14th Seanad
Members of the 22nd Dáil
Members of the 23rd Dáil
Members of the 24th Dáil
Members of the 25th Dáil
Members of the 26th Dáil
Members of the 27th Dáil
Members of the 28th Dáil
Members of the 29th Dáil
Members of the 30th Dáil
Local councillors in County Galway
Politicians from County Galway
Ministers of State of the 24th Dáil
Fine Gael senators